Aircraft manufacturing is an important industrial sector in Russia, employing around 355,300 people.  The dissolution of the Soviet Union led to a deep crisis for the industry, especially for the civilian aircraft segment.  The situation started improving during the middle of the first decade of the 2000s due to growth in air transportation and increasing demand.  A consolidation programme launched in 2005 led to the creation of the United Aircraft Corporation holding company, which includes most of the industry's key companies.

The Russian aircraft industry offers a portfolio of internationally competitive military aircraft such as MiG-29 and Su-27, while new projects such as the Sukhoi Superjet 100 are hoped to revive the fortunes of the civilian aircraft segment.  In 2009, companies belonging to the United Aircraft Corporation delivered 95 new fixed-wing aircraft to its customers, including 15 civilian models.  In addition, the industry produced over 141 helicopters.

History

First World War

Russia had 24 aircraft manufacturers at the outbreak of war, but they did not have the materials or the capacity to replace the aircraft that were lost. In particular they were dependent on foreign engines. It produced 1893 aircraft and imported 883 from 1914 to 1916, but it only produced 920 engines in this period while importing 2326. Production declined sharply after the February Revolution, and had virtually ceased when Russia left the war in 1918. 

The most famous aircraft produced during this period was the Sikorsky Ilya Muromets, the  first four-engine bomber to equip a dedicated strategic bombing unit. This heavy bomber was unrivalled in the early stages of the war, as the Central Powers had no comparable aircraft until much later. During World War I, Russia lost only one Sikorsky Ilya Muromets to enemy action in more than 400 sorties.

Soviet era

In the Soviet planned economic system, free market competition between companies was seen as wasteful. The Soviet system was instead multi-tiered, the chief components of which were design bureaus, known as OKBs, and manufacturing complexes.

The OKBs did not possess the means to mass-produce manufactured aircraft and the manufacturing complexes were unable to design aircraft.

Operational requirements for proposed aircraft were created by the Soviet Air Forces, for which individual OKBs would create a design informed by state research institutes. The state research institutes would then provide the OKSs with information on aerodynamics and available systems. This process led to competing designs being very similar in appearance. These competing designs would be evaluated against each other the winning design would be handed off to the manufacturing complexes for production. Most of these complexes were within the Soviet Union, but some production lines were assigned to allies within the Warsaw Pact. Due in part to political considerations, the assignment of production was widely dispersed, creating supply chains in which the role of state planning was paramount.

When exported, a third tier existed in the state-run export companies due to neither design bureaus nor manufacturing companies being responsible for the marketing of their products overseas. The state-run export companies did not benefit from the sale of their products, with proceeds instead being allocated to design and production units in order to meet centrally determined production targets.

With the dissolution of the Soviet Union, Warsaw Pact and Comecon there came a disconnect between end users, export companies, OKBs, assembly plants, and component manufacturers (some of which now existed in newly independent and sometimes hostile nations). Russia also found that entire segments of its aviation requirements now lay in foreign countries. One example of this was the manufacture of jet training aircraft, which was assigned to Czechoslovakia, while Poland got light helicopters and crop-dusting airplanes. Additionally, Romania possessed the manufacture of light helicopters, the majority of Russia's tactical airlift design capability in the form of the Antonov was now in Ukraine, and the main assembly plant for the Sukhoi Su-25 ground attack aircraft was in Georgia.

Post-Soviet adjustments 

Aerospace was a well-developed industry in the Soviet Union. In late 1980s, the Soviet Union accounted for 25% of the worldwide civilian and 40% of the worldwide military aircraft production. The consequences of the Soviet Union's dissolution in 1991 were however catastrophic. The whole manufacturing sector was devastated by imports, while the aerospace and automobile industries barely managed to survive under highly protective tariffs. On the positive side, the military aircraft industry managed to benefit from improving export possibilities. It profited from a large stock of components and parts which had been produced during Soviet times. The civilian aircraft industry fared much worse: while in 1990, the country had produced 715 civilian aircraft, by 1998 the number had dropped to 56 and in 2000 only four civilian aircraft were produced.

As the industry structure was deeply fractionalised, the consensus was that consolidation was necessary. For this purpose, President Boris Yeltsin created the VPK-MAPO (Military Industrial Complex – Moscow Aircraft Production Association), which included some key companies such as Mikoyan. MAPO later became the Russian Aircraft Company (RAC) 'MiG'. This stage of consolidation was however not very successful, and MAPO was later merged with Sukhoi.

The aerospace industry's total output in 2000 was $2.7 billion, with a net profit of $600 million. Exports of military aircraft in 2000 amounted to $1.3 billion.

2000–2005: Start of a recovery 

At the turn of the millennium, the civilian aircraft industry was in a massive financial crisis. Only a few aircraft were built and after-sale maintenance was minuscule.  Many planes, both new and old, failed to receive international safety and environmental certifications.  Two key companies, Aviastar-SP and Voronezh Aircraft Production Association were almost bankrupt. The profits of the civilian aircraft industry totaled just $300 million in 2001. However, in August 2000, the situation started improving considerably. In 2001, the industry finally started receiving new orders from leasing companies.  Air transportation grew about 8% a year, and by 2004 domestic demand for new aircraft was soaring. Key companies managed to pay their debts or get them restructured, and production levels were increasing again.

The military aircraft industry survived the 15 years of crisis almost exclusively through exports. Only in 2005 did the industry start to receive substantial financing from the state budget.

2005–2010: Industry consolidation programme 

In 2005, the government under President Vladimir Putin initiated an industry consolidation programme to bring the main aircraft producing companies under a single umbrella organization, the United Aircraft Corporation (UAC). The aim was optimize production lines and minimise losses. The programme was divided in three parts: reorganization and crisis management (2007–2010), evolution of existing projects (2010–2015) and further progress within the newly created structure (2015–2025).

The UAC, one of the so-called national champions and comparable to EADS in Europe, enjoyed considerable financial support from the Russian government, and injected money to the companies it had acquired to improve their financial standing. The UACs first budget in 2007, was about 2 billion rubles, and next year it increased to 24 billion rubles (about $770 million).

The deliveries of civilian aircraft increased to 6 in 2005, and in 2009 the industry delivered 15 civilian aircraft, worth 12.5 billion roubles, mostly to domestic customers.

Despite the global financial crisis, Russia's aircraft manufacturing industry as a whole managed to increase production and sales by 19.5% in 2009.

2015–today: New projects

Fifth-generation fighter 

In 1998, the Russian Air Force asked the industry to develop a light multirole frontline aircraft. In 2001, the requirements were upgraded to a multirole frontline aircraft system, which later became the fifth-generation fighter Sukhoi Su-57, regarded as Russia's response to the American Joint Strike Fighter. The Su-57 performed its maiden flight in 2010, breaking United States's complete monopoly on the development and production of fifth-generation jets. Moscow Defense Brief hailed it as a major coup for the Russian aerospace industry, writing that:
"while not America's equal militarily, Russia is still a solid second in terms of defense technology, outranking both Western Europe and China and punching well above its economic weight."

Russian prime minister Vladimir Putin announced that government would increase financing of Russian defence industry complex.

Su-57 development could be delayed due to international sanctions on Russia's defence industries following the 2022 Russian invasion of Ukraine, and Russia could not import semiconductors and high-tech machining equipment from the European Union.

Sukhoi Superjet 100 

The Sukhoi Superjet 100 regional airliner is the first major Russian civilian aircraft whose development was started after 1991. The plane, which first flew in 2008, was described in 2009 as the most important and successful civil aircraft program of the Russian aerospace industry. Designed by the United Aircraft Corporation subsidiary Sukhoi in cooperation with foreign partners, all versions of the plane are assembled by Komsomolsk-on-Amur Aircraft Production Association (KnAAPO) in the Russian Far East, while Novosibirsk Aircraft Production Association (NAPO) focuses on component production. The two companies have been heavily investing in upgrading of their facilities, and were expected to produce 70 airframes by 2012. Sukhoi delivered only three SSJs in the first half of 2019; its financial results showed a sevenfold drop in aircraft sales revenue and a fourfold drop in overall sales revenue, resulting in a 32% increase in its net loss. The company needs to achieve a production rate of 32 to 34 aircraft per year to make a profit, though demand for Russian models in the 60–120 seat category was forecast to be only 10 aircraft per year over a 20-year period. In the short-term, the company's main hope was that Aeroflot would firm up its 2018 preliminary agreement for 100 SSJs.

Irkut MC-21 

Development of the Irkut MC-21 passenger aircraft was begun in the early 2000s. The aircraft, which will have a passenger capacity of 150–200 and a range of 5,000 km, is being designed by Irkut Corporation, initially in cooperation with foreign partners. It is targeted at the most popular segment of the domestic airline industry, and is intended to replace older planes such as the Tupolev Tu-154. The program is in the production phase. The MC-21 certification and delivery was initially planned by 2016, but delivery was delayed. The developers aim to sell 1,200–1,500 planes in total, amounting to a 12–15% share of the international market. 

In 2022, after international sanctions against Russia were imposed due to the 2022 Russian invasion of Ukraine, Rosaviatsia announced that in a resulting change of plans Russia will only use a domestic engine. The original model - the MC-21-300 powered by Pratt & Whitney PW1000G engines - will not enter service, and instead production will have to wait for the MC-21-310, powered by the Russian Aviadvigatel PD-14, built by the United Engine Corporation. The MC-21-300 consists of between 40% and 50% imported parts, and Irkut will need to replace those that were to be supplied by the sanctioning countries.

Other projects 
Other new aircraft developed in recent times include the Yak-130 advanced trainer and light attack jet, the modernized Tu-204SM and the Ukrainian An-148 regional aircraft, which was mostly manufactured in Voronezh prior to worsening Ukrainian-Russian relations. Seaplane manufacturer Beriev is also designing several new passenger aircraft. Tu-214 and the cargo Il-76 will be re-manufactured by 2023.

Structure 

In 2008, the aircraft industry consisted of 106 enterprises, 18 of which belonged to the United Aircraft Corporation. One of the most successful companies is Sukhoi, which possesses a wide portfolio of internationally competitive military aircraft, including the Su-27, Su-30 and Su-35 models. On the civilian segment, the company's most important project is the Superjet 100. Komsomolsk-on-Amur Aircraft Production Association, Russia's largest aircraft enterprise, is responsible for manufacturing Sukhoi products. Joint Stock Company Tupolev focuses on the civil aviation market with its Tu-204 and Tu-214 planes, but is also responsible for the long-range bomber Tu-160 and for developing its successors. Mass production of Tu-204 planes is accomplished by Aviastar SP, located in Ulyanovsk, while the Tu-214 variant is produced by Kazan Aircraft Production Association. Ilyushin focuses on the military cargo and transport sector. Irkut has a portfolio of trainer and amphibious aircraft projects and competes in the onboard electronics and avionics niche. In the unmanned aerial vehicle segment, ZALA Aero and Vega Radio Engineering Corporation are among the leading companies.

Scientific institutions 
 Central Aerohydrodynamic Institute
 Gromov Flight Research Institute
 Baranov Central Institute of Aviation Motor Development 
 All-Russian Institute Of Aviation Materials
 State Scientific Research Institute of Aviation Systems

Production

Civilian aircraft production until 2013

Military aircraft 
On the military segment, companies belonging to UAC delivered 84 new aircraft and knockdown kits. Over 60 aircraft were modernized or underwent overhaul.

Helicopters

Revenue 
The aircraft industry's revenue from sales in 2008 was 226.6 billion rubles (105.3 billion for UAC), and the export share was 29% (52.5% for UAC).

Economic significance 

Russia's aircraft industry is one of the backbone branches of the country's economy. It is one of the most science-intensive hi-tech sectors and employs the largest number of skilled personnel. The production and value of the military aircraft branch far outstrips other defense industry sectors, and aircraft products make up more than half of the country's arms exports.

Employment 
In 2008, the number of personnel estimated to be working for the aircraft industry was 355,300. The United Aircraft Corporation holding, which encompasses most of the industry's key companies, had 97,500 employees in 2009. Of this amount, 85,500 worked in production at factories, 11,100 worked in the design bureaus and 900 in management and leasing companies. The average age of UAC personnel working in production was 44 years, and 49 for the personnel working in the design bureaus. The ratio of higher education graduates was 34%.

See also 
 Glossary of Russian and USSR aviation acronyms
 List of Russian aerospace engineers
 Space industry of Russia
 RS-26 Rubezh
 3M22 Zircon

References

External links 
 

 
Aircraft manufactured in Russia